Edward Thorp(e) may refer to:

 Edward Thorpe (chemist) (1845–1925), Thomas Edward Thorpe, British chemist
 Edward O. Thorp (born 1932), American mathematician & entrepreneur

See also 
Eddie Thorpe, character played by Greg Finley
Ed Thorp Memorial Trophy
 Ted Thorpe (disambiguation)